Asthenosoma ijimai is a species of sea urchin of the family Echinothuriidae. Their armour is covered with spines. It is placed in the genus Asthenosoma and lives in the sea. Asthenosoma ijimai was first scientifically described in 1897 by Yoshiwara.

See also 
 Asterechinus elegans
 Asthenosoma dilatatum
 Asthenosoma intermedium

References 

ijimai
Animals described in 1897